Mirakl is a French cloud-based e-commerce software company jointly headquartered in Paris, France and Somerville, Massachusetts. It provides online marketplace software to retailers, manufacturers and wholesalers.

History 
Co-founders Philippe Corrot and Adrien Nussenbaum met in 2004 and founded Splitgames, a B2C e-commerce marketplace, together in 2006. Corrot and Nussenbaum later founded Mirakl in 2012.

In 2013, Mirakl opened its first UK office. Mirakl launched its Boston-area headquarters in 2015.

Mirakl introduced the Mirakl Marketplace Platform for Services in 2017. That same year, Mirakl was included in Gartner's Hype Cycle for Digital Commerce: Marketplace Operation Applications. SAP became an official reseller of Mirakl's Marketplace Platform the following year. In 2018, the company launched Mirakl Catalog Manager (MCM) to improve product data quality. Mirakl Connect, a marketplace ecosystem platform, was launched in 2019.

In 2020, Mirakl launched 66 new online marketplaces, including platforms for Carrefour, H&M Home, Decathlon, and Kroger. The company launched its StopCovid19.fr platform to help distribute Personal Protective Equipment to combat the COVID-19 pandemic. This included delivering 300,000 liters of hand sanitizer and 320,000 face masks in less than a week. Ahold Delhaize announced that it would launch its digital marketplace at the beginning of 2021 using Mirakl’s software platform.

In 2021, Hudson's Bay partnered with Mirakl to launch its new third-party online marketplace on TheBay.com. In April, United Natural Foods partnered with Mirakl to develop North America’s first online wholesale food marketplace.

In May 2021, Mirakl announced the release of new features, including categorization AI, unified dropship operations, and streamlined B2B selling. L'Oréal’s SalonCentric rolled out a new e-commerce marketplace in June using Mirakl’s Marketplace Platform, and Debenhams did the same in October.

In November 2021, Macy’s, Inc. announced that it will partner with Mirakl to launch an online marketplace at macys.com and bloomingdales.com. Mirakl also announced its first acquisition of French invoice and compliance startup Octobat.

Customers 
Mirakl has set up SaaS marketplace platforms for over 350 companies globally including: Boots, Macy's, Carrefour, Conrad Electronic, and Toyota Material Handling,

Reception 
In 2012, Mirakl received the "Best Solution" award in the New Services category of E-commerce Awards. The following year, the company won the IBM Smartcamp Award. In May 2014, Mirakl was a finalist of the IBM Business Partner Beacon Awards.

Mirakl was named a WEF Technology Pioneer in 2020.

References

Software companies of France
2011 establishments in France